Edmundo Vlinder (6 February 1926 – February 2009) was a Curaçaoan footballer. He competed in the men's tournament at the 1952 Summer Olympics.

References

External links
 
 

1926 births
2009 deaths
Curaçao footballers
Netherlands Antilles international footballers
Olympic footballers of the Netherlands Antilles
Footballers at the 1952 Summer Olympics
Place of birth missing
Association football defenders
Pan American Games bronze medalists for the Netherlands Antilles
Footballers at the 1955 Pan American Games
Pan American Games medalists in football
Medalists at the 1955 Pan American Games